St. Mary Congregational Church in Abbeville, Louisiana is the oldest incorporated, predominantly African-American church in Vermilion Parish. Its historic Gothic Revival style church at 213 S. Louisiana Avenue, constructed in 1905 to replace a previous building, was added to the National Register of Historic Places in 1999.

American Missionary Association records show the congregation dates to at least 1877.

The structure is a three-bay, gable-fronted church with a prominent corner tower.  The tower is three-stage and square.

Rev. Kevin M. A. Williams, Sr. is the pastor.

References

External links
 

Churches on the National Register of Historic Places in Louisiana
Gothic Revival church buildings in Louisiana
Churches completed in 1905
Churches in Vermilion Parish, Louisiana
National Register of Historic Places in Vermilion Parish, Louisiana
1877 establishments in Louisiana
Religious organizations established in 1877